Nickels is a Canadian casual dining restaurant chain.  The restaurant has an extensive menu ranging from complete breakfasts to hamburgers, milkshakes, pizza, chicken, ribs, salads and a number of sandwiches, including Montreal-style smoked meat.

History
Nickels was originally created by pop diva Céline Dion and four other friends, who opened their first restaurant in 1990. The name came from the couple's lucky number, 5. The parent company claims an ongoing business relationship with Dion.

Nickels has since expanded to several franchised restaurants located primarily in Quebec and Ontario.  Originally designed to resemble a typical North American family diner, Nickels redesigned some of its restaurants and introduced a grill and bar concept. The most recent iteration is operating as Nickels Delicatessen with a deli and bar concept.

Nickels is now part of the Foodtastic group of restaurants which also includes Les Rôtisseries Benny, La Belle & La Boeuf, Souvlaki Bar, Carlos & Pepe's, Vinnie Gambini's Italian Restaurants and Bacaro, Chocolato, Big Rig, Monza and Au Coq.

Locations

 Quebec
 Gatineau
 Joliette
 Laval
Montreal
Place Versailles
Saint-Laurent
Saint Hubert Street
Peel Street
Le Boulevard
 Sainte-Adèle
 Saint-Jérôme

See also

List of Canadian restaurant chains

References

External links
 Nickels Delicatessen

Restaurant chains in Canada
Companies based in Montreal
Celine Dion